Dougaj  is a region and town situated in the south of Western Sahara of Africa approximately midway between the Agwanit region and the Moroccan Wall, 119 km from Fderik, Mauritania. Dougaj is located in the part of Western Sahara controlled by the Polisario Front and often referred to as the Free Zone or Liberated Territories. It is the head of the 6th military region of the Sahrawi Arab Democratic Republic, and holds an SPLA military outpost.

Infrastructure
On late June 2012, the Sahrawi minister of Construction and Urbanization of the Liberated Territories laid the foundation stone of Dougaj's new school.

References

External links
Photo showing Dougaj military base 

Populated places in Western Sahara
Sahrawi Arab Democratic Republic